Events from the year 1717 in art.

Events
 April 13 – Thomas Coke purchases a marble statue of Artemis/Diana dated to 190–200 AD, believed to be a copy of a mid 4th century BC Hellenistic original, for 900 crowns, making it the most expensive item he acquired for the art collections of Holkham Hall.

Paintings

 Charles Jervas – Portrait of Isaac Newton
 Jean-Marc Nattier – Portraits of Peter the Great and Catherine I of Russia
 Enoch Seeman – Portrait of Elihu Yale
 Antoine Watteau
 Embarkation for Cythera
 Les plaisirs du bal (approximate date)

Births
 February 14 – Jan Palthe, Dutch portrait painter (died 1769)
 February 17 – Adam Friedrich Oeser, German etcher, painter and sculptor (died 1799)
 April 23 – Pieter Barbiers, Dutch painter (died 1780)
 May 4 - Jean-Charles François, French engraver (died 1769)
 June 20 – Jacques Saly, French sculptor (died 1776)
 August 11 – Giovanni Carlo Galli-Bibiena, Italian architect, designer, and painter (died 1760)
 December 4 – Norbert Grund, Czech painter of the Rococo style (died 1767)
 date unknown
 Giuseppe Bottani, Italian painter active in the Baroque period (died 1784)
 Alexander Cozens, British landscape-painter in water-colours and published teacher of painting (died 1786)
 Robert Wood, British engraver, gentleman and politician (died 1771)

Deaths
 January 16 – Elias Brenner, Swedish painter and archeologist (born 1647)
 February 18 – Giovanni Maria Morandi, Italian painter of altarpieces (born 1622)
 April 5 – Jean Jouvenet, French painter (born 1647)
 April 8 - Antoine Benoist, French painter and sculptor (born 1632)
 May 7 – Bon Boullogne, French painter (born 1649)
 November 21 – Jean-Baptiste Santerre, French painter (born 1650)
 date unknown
 Luigi Quaini, Italian painter of landscapes and architecture (born 1643)
 Carlo Antonio Rambaldi, Italian painter of the Baroque period (born 1680)
 Girolamo Ruggieri, Italian painter of landscapes and battle paintings (born 1662)
 John Slezer, Dutch- or German-born military engineer and artist (born 1650)
 Wang Hui, Chinese landscape painter, the best known of the Four Wangs (born 1632)

 
Years of the 18th century in art
1710s in art